Association management is a field of management which focuses on the management of associations. There are more than 25,000 national associations and 65,000 local, state or regional associations in the United States. These organizations employ more than 500,000 professionals. 

Association management is a distinct field of management because of the unique environment of associations. Associations are unique in that the "owners" are dues-paying members. Members also govern their association through an elected board or other governing body, along with association committees, commissions, task forces, councils and other units. Typically, the board selects, retains and evaluates a chief executive officer or an executive director who is responsible for the day-to-day management of the association and paid staff. 

Managers within the association environment are responsible for many of the same tasks that are found in other organizational contexts. These include human resource management, financial management, meeting management, IT management, and project management. Other aspects of management are unique for association managers. These include: membership recruitment and retention; tax-exempt accounting and financial management; development of non-dues revenue and fundraising. Association managers must also be familiar with laws and regulations that pertain only to associations. To attain the knowledge needed to effectively operate in association management, its practitioners may choose to pursue the Certified Association Executive designation. This qualification may be obtained via the American Society of Association Executives ASAE.

As in the US, in several other countries national societies of association managers exist. See the links below for the ones which exist in some nations belonging to the British Commonwealth. In Europe there also exists the European Society of Association Executives.

Association Management professionals typically use Membership Software to organize and manage the day-to-day operations of the association they are in charge of.

See also 
 Academic conference
 Association management company
 American Society of Association Executives
 Membership software

References

Bibliography

External links 
American Society of Association Executives (ASAE)
Association Forum
UK Institute of Association Management
Australian Society of Association Executives
Canadian Society of Association Executives
European Society of Association Executives
HOA | COA Management Company
 HOA Management Software

Management by type
Non-profit organizations